An election to Oxfordshire County Council took place on 5 May 2005 as part of the 2005 United Kingdom local elections, coinciding with the 2005 United Kingdom general election. 74 councillors were elected from various electoral divisions, which returned either one, two or three county councillors each by first-past-the-post voting for a four-year term of office. This was the first election using the new electoral divisions following proposals from the Electoral Commission in 2004, meaning the council would consist of three seats more than previously.

All locally registered electors (British, Irish, Commonwealth and European Union citizens) who were aged 18 or over on 5 May 2005 were entitled to vote in the local elections. Those who were temporarily away from their ordinary address (for example, away working, on holiday, in student accommodation or in hospital) were also entitled to vote in the local elections, although those who had moved abroad and registered as overseas electors cannot vote in the local elections. It is possible to register to vote at more than one address (such as a university student who had a term-time address and lives at home during holidays) at the discretion of the local Electoral Register Office, but it remains an offence to vote more than once in the same local government election.

Summary 
The election saw the Conservative Party increase their majority on the council by an extra 17 seats, with Labour slipping into third place behind the Liberal Democrats. The Liberal Democrats maintained most of their seats and the Green party raised their seat total to five. 

Owing to a national trend of decreasing Labour share after their 2001 landslide election, the re-drawing of boundary lines, as well as the high levels of wealth and older median age of residents in the county, the results were in line with expectations.

Division Results 
* Due to the redistribution of boundary lines, all seats have been classed as new seats. Incumbent councillors have, however, been marked with an asterisk.

References 

2005 English local elections
2005
2000s in Oxfordshire